The Lycée Franco-Libanais Nahr Ibrahim, LFLNI or LNI is a prestigious French primary and secondary school located in Nahr Ibrahim, Lebanon, founded in 1992 by the Mission laïque française. The location of the school overlooks the "Abraham River", (Nahr Ibrahim in Arabic) on a cliff facing the sea.

Design and history 
The school consists of three buildings, A and B for grade 6 to grade 12 and one for grade 1 to grade 5, all of which made from concrete. In 1992, a parents' committee and the Mission laïque française agreed to establish the school on a partially-built site in Al-Maayssra whose owner was planning to establish a school in building A. In 1994, high school students began attending school in the newly opened building B. In 2002, a gymnasium and sports field were added to the complex, and in 2004, a fully equipped two-story science laboratory was added.

Education 
The school caters for some 1,500 pupils between the ages of 3 and 18 and teaches predominantly in French, but the school teaches English, Arabic and Spanish as well. Its curriculum and management are overseen by the French National Ministry of Education through the Agency for the Teaching of French Abroad (AEFE). In 2009–2010, 1132 pupils at the lycée were Lebanese, 331 were French, and 14 pupils from other nationalities.

Notable Alumni 
 Ghadi El Khoury
 Sarah Darwiche
 Elie Badawi
 Aya Stephan

See also
 Agency for French Education Abroad
 Education in France
 International school
 List of international schools
 Mission laïque française
 Multilingualism
 Nahr Ibrahim

References

External links
 
 

French international schools in Lebanon
Trilingual schools
Schools offering Cambridge International Examinations
Educational institutions established in 1992
1992 establishments in Lebanon
AEFE contracted schools
Mission laïque française